The Son of Man is a 1964 painting by the Belgian surrealist painter René Magritte. It is perhaps his best-known artwork.

Magritte painted it as a self-portrait. The painting consists of a man in an overcoat and a bowler hat standing in front of a low wall, beyond which are the sea and a cloudy sky. The man's face is largely obscured by a hovering green apple. However, the man's eyes can be seen peeking over the edge of the apple. Another subtle feature is that the man's left arm appears to bend backwards at the elbow.

About the painting, Magritte said:

Similar paintings
The Son of Man closely resembles two other Magritte paintings. The Great War (La grande guerre, 1964) is a variation on The Son of Man which pictures only the figure from the torso up. The Taste of the Invisible (Le Gout de l'invisible) is a gouache painting of the same subject.

Another painting from the same year, called The Great War on Facades (La Grande Guerre Façades, 1964), features a person standing in front of a wall overlooking the sea (as in The Son of Man), but it is a woman, holding an umbrella, her face covered by flowers. There is also Man in the Bowler Hat, a similar painting wherein a man's face is obscured by a bird rather than an apple.

In popular culture 
In 1970, Norman Rockwell created a playful homage to The Son of Man as a  oil painting entitled Mr. Apple, in which a man's head is replaced, rather than hidden, by a red apple.

The painting plays an important role in the 1999 version of The Thomas Crown Affair. It appears several times, first when Crown and Catherine Banning are walking through the museum and she jokingly calls it his portrait, and particularly in the final robbery scenes when numerous men wearing bowler hats and trench coats carry briefcases throughout the museum to cover Crown's movements and confuse the security team.

The green apple was an ongoing motif in Magritte's work. His use of it in the 1966 painting Le Jeu De Morre, owned by Paul McCartney, inspired the Beatles to name their record company Apple Corps.

References 

Paintings by René Magritte
Surrealist paintings
1964 paintings
Apples
Oil on canvas paintings